Maine School Administrative District 60 (MSAD/RSU 60) is the school district covering the towns of Berwick, North Berwick, and Lebanon.

School Board Members
North Berwick Representatives
Board Vice-Chair: David Lentini
Stan Cowan
Jacqueline Alwin

Berwick Representatives
Margaret Wheeler
Ryan McCabe
Robert Keys

Lebanon Representatives
Board Chair: Joanne Potter
Patricia Endsley
Beverly Olean

Schools in MSAD/RSU 60

High Schools
Noble High School Grades 8-12 

Middle Schools
Noble Middle School Grades 6-7

Elementary Schools
Vivian E. Hussey School Grades K-3
Hanson School Grades K-3
North Berwick Primary School Grades K-5
Eric L. Knowlton School Grades 4-5
Lebanon Elementary School Grades 4-5
Mary R. Hurd School Grades 4-5

Other
Noble Adult & Community Education Located within Noble High School

2012-2013 District Restructuring
To alleviate overcrowding at some district schools and to better use underpopulated facilities, a restructuring plan was put into place and set to begin in 2012-2013. Instead of having K-4 kids in the Vivian E. Hussey School, the school now holds students K-3 while the Eric L. Knowlton School holds students 4-5 instead of the former 5-6. Also due to crowding, Noble Middle School moved the eighth grade into Noble High School and now holds students in grades 6-7 as opposed to the previous 7-8.

References

External links

60
Education in York County, Maine